Ctenotrypauchen chinensis is a species of goby native to fresh waters of China.  This species is the only known member of its genus.

References

Amblyopinae
Monotypic fish genera
Fish described in 1867